The 2018 Grand Prix SAR La Princesse Lalla Meryem was a women's professional tennis tournament played on clay courts. It was the 18th edition of the tournament and part of the WTA International tournaments category of the 2018 WTA Tour. It took place in Rabat, Morocco, between 30 April and 5 May 2018.

Points and prize money

Prize money

Singles main draw entrants

Seeds

 Rankings are as of April 23, 2018.

Other entrants
The following players received wildcards into the singles main draw:
  Timea Bacsinszky
  Diae El Jardi 
  Katarina Zavatska

The following players received entry using a protected ranking into the main draw:
  Kristína Kučová
  Bethanie Mattek-Sands

The following players received entry from the qualifying draw:
  Paula Badosa Gibert
  Fiona Ferro
  Sílvia Soler Espinosa
  Tamara Zidanšek

The following player received entry as a lucky loser:
  Alexandra Dulgheru
  Magdalena Fręch

Withdrawals
  Timea Bacsinszky → replaced by  Magdalena Fręch
  Catherine Bellis → replaced by  Christina McHale
  Kateryna Bondarenko → replaced by  Sara Errani
  Kateryna Kozlova → replaced by  Alexandra Dulgheru
  Tatjana Maria → replaced by  Kristína Kučová
  Maria Sakkari → replaced by  Jana Fett

Retirements
  Paula Badosa Gibert
  Laura Siegemund

Doubles main draw entrants

Seeds 

 1 Rankings as of April 23, 2018.

Other entrants 
The following pairs received wildcards into the doubles main draw:
  Oumaima Aziz /  Diae El Jardi
  Sada Nahimana /  Sandra Samir

Champions

Singles

  Elise Mertens def.  Ajla Tomljanović, 6–2, 7–6(7–4)

Doubles

  Anna Blinkova /  Raluca Olaru def.  Georgina García Pérez /  Fanny Stollár, 6–4, 6–4

References

External links 
 Official website

Morocco Open
Grand Prix SAR La Princesse Lalla Meryem
Morocco